Konostaulos or konostablos ("constable", in Greek variously ), later corrupted to kontostaulos/kontostablos (κοντόσταυλος), was a late Byzantine title, adopted from the Normans. The derivative dignity of megas konostaulos (μέγας κονόσταυλος, "Grand Constable") became one of the highest court posts in the Palaiologan period (1261–1453) and was awarded to high-ranking generals.

History
It was adopted in the 11th century, under influence from the Normans of Sicily, from the French connétable (cf. English "constable"), which in turn derived from the Latin comes stabuli ("count of the stable"). In the 11th–12th centuries, the konostaulos appears to have been a purely honorary title, although it may also have replaced the middle Byzantine komēs tou staulou, the direct descendant of the late Roman comes stabuli, in his functions.

In the last years of the reign of the Nicaean emperor John III Vatatzes, the post of megas konostaulos was created, being the chief of the "Frankish" (i.e. Western European) mercenaries. Its first holder was the future emperor Michael Palaiologos. Thereafter, however, the title appears to have become separated from any particular office and to have become a purely honorary dignity. It ranked quite high in the Palaiologan-era hierarchy, coming ninth in the overall precedence, after the megas primmikerios, and was therefore conferred upon the members of several Byzantine noble families, as well as minor foreign rulers allied to the Byzantine Empire, such as Licario and Leonardo II Tocco. Its distinctive costume is described in the mid-14th century Book of Offices of pseudo-Kodinos: a gold-brocaded brimmed hat (skiadion), a plain silk kabbadion tunic, but without the usual staff of office (dikanikion). For ceremonies and festivities, he bore the domed skaranikon hat, of orange silk and decorated with gold wire embroidery, and with an enameled portrait of the emperor standing in front and another of the emperor enthroned on the rear. The simple title konostaulos continued in use, at least in the Despotate of the Morea, but its functions are unclear.

List of known megaloi konostauloi

References

Sources

 
 
 
 
 
 
 

Byzantine court titles
Byzantine military offices